The 1985–86 Bulgarian Cup was the 46th season of the Bulgarian Cup. Levski Sofia won the competition, beating CSKA Sofia 2–1 in the final at the Vasil Levski National Stadium in Sofia.

First round

|-
!colspan=3 style="background-color:#D0F0C0;" |1985

|}

Second round

|-
!colspan=3 style="background-color:#D0F0C0;" |1985

|}

Third round

Group 1

Group 2

Group 3

Group 4

Quarter-finals

Group 1

Group 2

Group 3

Group 4

Semi-finals

|-
!colspan=4 style="background-color:#D0F0C0;" |8 February 1986

|}

Third place play-off

|-
!colspan=4 style="background-color:#D0F0C0;" |26 April 1986

|}

Final

Details

References

1985-86
1985–86 domestic association football cups
Cup